The Grajaú River is a river of Maranhão state indo 09p9 northeastern Brazil. It is a tributary of the Mearim River.

See also
List of rivers of Maranhão

References
Brazilian Ministry of Transport

Rivers of Maranhão